Kathryn Margaret Hudson (born 28 March 1949) was the Parliamentary Commissioner for Standards for the United Kingdom House of Commons. Appointed in September 2012, she served until 31 December 2017.

She was previously (from 2008) Deputy Parliamentary and Health Service Ombudsman. From 2004 to 2008 she was National Director for Social Care at the Department of Health.

References

External links 
 Parliamentary Commissioner for Standards: official website
 Register of Members' Interests

1949 births
Living people
Ombudsmen in the United Kingdom